The 2007 Setanta Sports Cup was the 3rd staging of the cross-border cup competition that takes place between football clubs from the Republic of Ireland and Northern Ireland. The final was played at Windsor Park in Belfast, Northern Ireland on 12 May 2007, and was won by Drogheda United with a 4-3 penalty shoot-out victory over Linfield when the scores were level at 1–1 after extra time. Drogheda won the trophy for the second successive year.

Shelbourne's withdrawal
The draw for the 2007 Setanta Cup competition was made on 7 December 2006 with the original competing teams being the identical ones to the previous year's competition. On 30 January 2007, however, Shelbourne announced that they were withdrawing from the competition for reasons relating to their financial troubles and the fact that they would be unlikely to field a team of players. Their place was given to the 2006 FAI Cup runners-up to Derry City, St Patrick's Athletic, despite the fact that the next best-placed in the previous season's league (Shelbourne's qualification route), who did not have a place in the Setanta Cup already, were Sligo Rovers.

Group stage
The draw for this round was held 7 December 2006.  The matches were played 26 February-17 April 2007.

Teams that progressed to the Semi-Finals are indicated in bold type.

Teams eliminated from the Setanta Cup are indicated in italics.

Group A

Group B

Semi-finals
The draw for the semi-finals was made by drawing the winners of Group A against the runners-up of Group B and vice versa, with group winners having home advantage. There would be no replays if the matches were drawn; instead, extra time would decide winners immediately thereafter. If extra time did not decide the winners, a set of five alternating penalty kicks would decide winners.

Final

Goalscorers
5 goals
  Alan Kirby (St Patrick's Athletic)
  Roy O'Donovan (Cork City)

3 goals
  Denis Behan (Cork City)
  Tony Grant (Drogheda United)
  Sean O'Connor (St Patrick's Athletic)
  Aidan O'Kane (Linfield)

2 goals

  Michael Collins (Portadown)
  Mark Dickson (Linfield)
  John O'Flynn (Cork City)
  Aidan O'Keeffe (Drogheda United)
  Gary O'Neill (St Patrick's Athletic)
  Thomas Stewart (Linfield)
  Éamon Zayed (Drogheda United)

1 goal

  Gary Beckett (Derry City)
  Killian Brennan (Derry City)
  Stephen Brennan (St Patrick's Athletic)
  Kevin Deery (Derry City)
  Everaldo (Dungannon Swifts)
  Keith Fahey (St Patrick's Athletic)
  Mark Farren (Derry City) 
  JP Gallagher (Dungannon Swifts)
  Joe Gamble (Cork City)
  Jason Hill (Glentoran)
  Oran Kearney (Linfield)
  Roy Lally (Cork City)
  Cillian Lordan (Cork City)
  Eamonn Lynch (St Patrick's Athletic)
  Darragh Maguire (St Patrick's Athletic)
  Mark McAllister (Dungannon Swifts)
  Paul McAreavey (Linfield)
  Rodney McAree (Dungannon Swifts)
  Shane McCabe (Dungannon Swifts)
  Ryan McCluskey (Dungannon Swifts)
  Paddy McCourt (Derry City)
  Gary McCutcheon (Portadown)
  Willo McDonagh (Glentoran)
  Kevin McHugh (Derry City)
  BJ McMenamin (Glentoran)
  Anthony Murphy (St Patrick's Athletic)
  Joseph Ndo (St Patrick's Athletic)
  Kyle Neill (Glentoran)
  Colin O'Brien (Cork City)
  Mark Quigley (St Patrick's Athletic)
  Peter Thompson (Linfield)

External links
 Official Setanta Cup Site

2007
1
Set